The marbled rockcod (Notothenia rossii) is a species of marine ray-finned fish, belonging to the family Nototheniidae, the notothens or cod icefishes. This is a commercially important species.

Taxonomy
The marbled rockcod was first formally described in 1844 by the Scottish naval surgeon, naturalist and Arctic explorer John Richardson with no type locality given, although it is thought likely to be Kerguelen Island. Richardson gave it the specific name  rossii which honours James Clark Ross, the leader of the Ross expedition, a scientific expedition by the vessels HMS Erebus and HMS Terror to survey and explore the coasts of Antarctica.

Description
The dorsal fin is divided in two parts, with four to seven spines in the front portion and 32 to 36 soft rays in the long, back portion. The anal fin has 26 to 30 soft rays. The colour and pattern varies but it is typically dark brown with dark marbling on the upper body, paler on the lower body. The first dorsal fin has a dark spot in the membrane between each spine. The juveniles are yellowish or golden in colour during their benthic phase while the pelagic juveniles are silvery.

Distribution
The marbled rockcod's range includes the  northern end of the Antarctic Peninsula, the Scotia Arc, Prince Edward Islands, Crozet Islands, Kerguelen Islands, Heard Island and Macquarie Island, as well as the Ob Bank, and Lena Bank.

Biology
Marbled rockcod females become sexually mature at about six years of age. Along with mature males they move into the deeper water of the continental shelf. Spawning takes place once a year and the young fish stay mostly in shallow water in the fiords and bays, feeding mainly on zooplankton. Males can live for up to twelve years.

Fisheries
The marbled rockcod was heavily fished by Soviet fishers during the 1960s and 1970s, with catches exceeding 100,000 tonnes in some seasons; it almost disappeared from around South Georgia Island, and by 1980, was depleted throughout the Southern Ocean. It took the population 20 years to show signs of recovery.

References
 Tony Ayling & Geoffrey Cox, Collins Guide to the Sea Fishes of New Zealand,  (William Collins Publishers Ltd, Auckland, New Zealand 1982) 

marbled rockcod
Fish of the Southern Ocean
Fauna of the Crozet Islands
Fauna of the Kerguelen Islands
Fauna of Heard Island and McDonald Islands
marbled rockcod
Taxa named by John Richardson (naturalist)